Mustafa Yamulki (25 January 1866 – 25 May 1936), also known as "Nemrud" Mustafa Pasha, was a Kurdish military officer, chairman of the Ottoman military court, minister for education in the Kingdom of Kurdistan and a journalist. Mustafa was born in the city of Sulaimaniyah which was then in the Mosul Vilayet of the Ottoman Empire.

Early life
Mustafa was born into an old landowning family from Sulaimaniyah. Mustafa attended the Ottoman Military Academy at Constantinople (present-day Istanbul). He was from the powerful Bilbaz Kurdish tribe.

After the defeat of the Ottoman Empire in the World War I, he was appointed the head of the Turkish Court Martials on the 18 April 1920. As chairman of the Court, which was also called the "war tribunal of Nemrut Mustafa", he condemned Mustafa Kemal to death in absentia along with other of his associates. The warrant was also signed by Ali Kemal, Damad Ferid and the Sultan. Mustafa also sentenced Ebubekir Hazim (Tepeyran) the minister of the interior for aiding the Turkish nationalists. He was dismissed from this office in June.

Mustafa stated, 
Later, Mustafa was arrested and sentenced to 7 months in prison. However, he was pardoned by Sultan Mehmed VI in February 1921. In June 1921 he left Turkey for Syria and went on to live in Iraq.   

His brother-in-law Izzet Bey was the former governor of the Van Vilayet  and minister of the Pious foundations under Tavfiq Pashas cabinet.

Mustafa's son was Abdul Aziz Yamulki, the chief plotter of coup d'état against the Bakir Sidqi government.

Posts Held
 vice-governor of Bursa

References

External links
  Yamulki

1866 births
1936 deaths
People from Sulaymaniyah
Ottoman Military Academy alumni
Ottoman Army officers
Ottoman military personnel of the Balkan Wars
Ottoman military personnel of World War I
Kurdish people from the Ottoman Empire
Turkish Kurdish politicians
Pashas
Kingdom of Kurdistan
Witnesses of the Armenian genocide